The 2006 China Masters (officially known as the Aviva-Cofco China Masters Badminton Championships 2006  for sponsorship reasons) was badminton tournament which took place at the Sichuan Gymnasium in Chengdu, China, on from 8 to 12 March 2006 and had a total purse of $250,000. This is the first Grand Prix tournament to use 21-points system.

Tournament 
The 2006 China Masters was the fourth tournament of the 2006 IBF World Grand Prix and also part of the China Masters championships, which had been held since 2005.

Venue 
This international tournament was held at Sichuan Gymnasium in Chengdu, China.

Point distribution 
Below is the point distribution table for each phase of the tournament based on the IBF points system for the IBF World Grand Prix 4-star event.

Prize pool 
The total prize money for this tournament was US$250,000. The distribution of the prize money was in accordance with IBF regulations.

Men's singles

Finals

Top half

Section 1

Section 2

Bottom half

Section 3

Section 4

Women's singles

Finals

Top half

Section 1

Section 2

Bottom half

Section 3

Section 4

Men's doubles

Finals

Top half

Section 1

Section 2

Bottom half

Section 3

Section 4

Women's doubles

Finals

Top half

Bottom half

Mixed doubles

Finals

Top half

Bottom half

References

External links 
 Tournament Link
 2006 China Masters at sports.163.com

2006 IBF World Grand Prix
China Masters
China Masters
China Masters
Sport in Chengdu